Flying Hostess is a 1936 American drama film directed by Murray Roth and starring William Gargan, Judith Barrett and William Hall. A group of stewardesses undergo their training, and later thwart the hijacking of an airplane.

Partial cast

 William Gargan as Hal Cunningham  
 Judith Barrett as Helen Brooks  
 William Hall as Guy Edwards  
 Astrid Allwyn as Phyllis Crawford  
 Ella Logan as Edna Mulcahy  
 Andy Devine as Joe Williams  
 Addison Randall as Earl Spencer  
 Marla Shelton as Marion Beatty  
 Michael Loring as Pilot  
 Mary Alice Rice as Miss Davies  
 Richard Tucker as Doctor  
 Jonathan Hale as Kendall  
 Al Hill as 'Knuckles' Boland  
 Kenneth Harlan as 1st Detective  
 Pat Flaherty as 2nd Detective
 George Chandler as Florist

References

Bibliography
 Paris, Michael. From the Wright Brothers to Top Gun: Aviation, Nationalism, and Popular Cinema. Manchester University Press, 1995.

External links
 

1936 films
1936 drama films
American drama films
Universal Pictures films
American black-and-white films
American aviation films
Films directed by Murray Roth
1930s English-language films
1930s American films